Adult Contemporary is a chart published by Billboard ranking the top-performing songs in the United States in the adult contemporary music (AC) market.  First published in 1961, the listing was compiled until 1965 by simply extracting from the magazine's all-genre chart, the Hot 100, those songs which were deemed of an appropriate style and ranking them according to their placings on the Hot 100.  In 1962, 15 different songs topped the chart in 52 issues of the magazine.  The chart was published under the title Easy Listening through the issue of Billboard dated October 27, after which it was renamed Middle-Road Singles.

Ray Charles was the only artist with more than one number one in 1962.  He reached the top with two tracks from his album Modern Sounds in Country and Western Music, which is considered to have been a ground-breaking record.  "I Can't Stop Loving You" and "You Don't Know Me" spent a total of eight weeks in the top spot, the most for any artist.  "I Can't Stop Loving You" was one of a number of Easy Listening/Middle-Road number ones of 1962 to go all the way to number one on the Hot 100, and it also reached the top of Billboards R&B chart.

The longest unbroken run at number one on the Easy Listening/Middle-Road chart in 1962 was achieved by Acker Bilk, who spent seven consecutive weeks atop the listing with the instrumental "Stranger on the Shore".  The track also reached number one on the Hot 100, the first time this feat had been achieved by a British artist.  Bilk was one of two band leaders associated with the early 1960s UK jazz revival to top the Easy Listening/Middle-Road chart in 1962, as his number one came a month after Kenny Ball spent three weeks at number one with "Midnight in Moscow".  Ball was one of a number of acts with an Easy Listening/Middle-Road number one in 1962 who never topped the Hot 100 during their careers, along with The Lettermen, Burl Ives, Frank Ifield and Gene Pitney. The final Middle-Road number one of the year was "Go Away Little Girl" by Steve Lawrence.

Chart history

References

1962
United States Middle Road